Dharamjaygarh is a town and a nagar panchayat in Raigarh District  in the state of Chhattisgarh, India. Major languages spoken are Hindi and Chhattisgarhi, with a little Odia, Bengali and English. Laljeet Singh Rathia is a current MLA of the Dharamjaigarh constituency.

Geography

Dharamjaigarh is a taluk headquarters and prominent town in the Raigarh District of Chhattisgarh. It is located on Raigarh-Ambikapur highway, about 77 km north-west of Raigarh. Raipur is the nearest airport, and Raigarh is the nearest railhead for Dharamjaigarh. Bus services are available from the place to Raigarh, Raipur, Bilaspur, Ranchi, Garhwa, Banaras, and Ambikapur.

Demographics
 India census, Dharamjaigarh had a population of 13,603. Males constitute 50% of the population and females 50%. Dharamjaigarh has an average literacy rate of 64%, higher than the national average of 59.5%: male literacy is 72% and, female literacy is 55%. In Dharamjaigarh, 14% of the population is under 6 years of age.

History

Formerly known as Rābkob, Dharamjaigarh was the capital of the princely state of Udaipur before independence. The name of the place was changed from Rābkob to Dharamjaigarh which was named after Raja Bahadur Dharamjeet Singh Deo ruling chief, Udaipur State at that time. It was ruled by kings with the title Raja Bahadur. The kingly palace, along with the attached fruit orchards, is a major attraction of the town.

Major Attractions
Dharamjaigarh is a beautiful town with laid-back environs, surrounded by forests on all sides. A walk in any direction out of the city leads to dense, deciduous forests, dotted with small tribal villages. In the monsoon, there is a blanket of greenery all over. The town itself is divided into two parts - one located atop a small plateau, and the other known as Nichepara, below it. The two parts are divided by a steep slope, locally known as Ghatia. Some important places of tourist attraction are:

Ambitikara: Also known as Amli or Imlitikara, it has a famous temple of Goddess Kali beside a shallow river.
Sisringa: It is a prominent valley, overlooking the town, with winding roads and a small temple at its highest point.
Amadarha: It is a beautiful picnic spot on the banks of the Mand river with numerous low waterfalls and forests on hill-slopes.
Gayatri Mandir: It is one of the famous temples in the town.
Dashera Festival: A three-day carnival on the club grounds, it is one of the most eagerly awaited events in the town.
Hanuman Mandir Nichepara: Another famous temple in the lower section of the town.
Udyan Vibhag Narsury: It is like a town garden here many types of plants are present. Anyone wants to parches any plant then go and buy. 
The Christian Mission: It is a settlement of Christian missionaries working among the local tribals, and it also runs Church and a Hospital.
Poria fall-very beautiful fall in boro Dharamjaigarh
Crondha dam-big dam in krondha dharamjaigarh
Likhamada(oongna)- Rock Painting and tribal cave in oongana
radha Krishna mandir in Dharamjaygarh colony

Education
As of the 2011 Census of India, Dharamjaigarh had 27 primary schools, 12 middle schools, 1 secondary school and 8 senior-secondary schools along with 3 arts/commerce/science colleges.

Economy
The basis of the economy of Dharamjaigarh is agriculture which is mostly rainfed. Farmers grow mainly paddy. However, they don't have easy access to market for their produce and, therefore, do not get the right price for their crops. There are some rice mills, but they are too small to utilize all the produce. An IT company is assessing the potential to set up its base here, which may open in two-three years.

Dharamjaigarh is probably one of the most under-developed regions of Chhattisgarh. One of the major reasons for this is the difficulty of access. As mentioned earlier, the town is not on the railway network because of the uneven topography of the place, and the nearest railhead is about 77  km away. Most people have to move out of the place for education as well as jobs.

References

Cities and towns in Raigarh district